The 18th Legislative Assembly of Saskatchewan was elected in the Saskatchewan general election held in June 1975. The assembly sat from November 12, 1975, to September 19, 1978. The New Democratic Party (NDP) led by Allan Blakeney formed the government. The Liberal Party led by David Steuart formed the official opposition. Edward Malone replaced Steuart as party leader in 1976. After the Progressive Conservative Party won two by-elections and convinced two Liberal members to defect in 1977, the Progressive Conservative Party led by Richard Lee Collver shared the role of official opposition with the Liberals.

John Edward Brockelbank served as speaker for the assembly.

Members of the Assembly 
The following members were elected to the assembly in 1975:

Notes:

Party Standings 

Notes:

By-elections 
By-elections were held to replace members for various reasons:

Notes:

References 

Terms of the Saskatchewan Legislature